Cynthia Ann Christine Rothrock (born March 8, 1957) is an American martial artist and actress in martial arts films. Rothrock holds black belt rankings in seven styles of martial arts and was a high-level competitor in martial arts before becoming an actress.

Early life 
Rothrock was born March 8, 1957, in Wilmington, Delaware, to Edward and Ann (Exeter) Markowski. She grew up in Scranton, Pennsylvania, and started taking martial arts lessons at the age of 13. She is of Polish descent.

Career

Martial arts 
Rothrock was World Champion in forms and weapons five times between 1981 and 1985. These categories are not combat-oriented, being displays of fluidity of movement rather than fighting, and are not segregated into male and female categories but fully open to both sexes.

She took first place in forms 32 times and first place in weapons 12 times in her first 38 tournaments, including competing in "Men's Forms" three out of four times as there was no Women's Division. She was "Grand Master" of five tournaments and came in first place in 4 out of 5 fighting events.

She holds seven black belts and sashes in multiple Far Eastern martial disciplines, including Tang Soo Do, Taekwondo (Korean), Eagle Claw (Chinese), Wushu, Northern Shaolin, Ng Ying Kungfu (Chinese: 五形功夫), and Pai Lum White Dragon Kung Fu. She received her 6th degree black belt in Tang Soo Do Moo Duk Kwan in 2006. She was tested by Grand Master Robert Kovaleski, 9th Dan and chair of the I.T.M.A., and was later promoted by him to 7th degree black belt in 2011 and 8th degree black belt in 2015. She is a martial arts instructor and her favorite weapons are the hook swords.

In 1983, Rothrock was inducted into the Black Belt Magazine Hall of Fame as "Female Competitor of the Year". She was the first woman to appear on the cover of a martial arts magazine, and in 1986 co-authored a book with George Chung titled, Advanced Dynamic Kicks. In 2014, she was honored with the Legacy Award at the Urban Action Showcase & Expo at HBO.

She is the first woman to appear on the cover of Karate Illustrated (August '81)

Acting 
In 1983, while Rothrock was on Ernie Reyes' West Coast Demonstration Team, she was discovered by Golden Harvest in Los Angeles, California. It was two years (1985) later that she made her first martial arts movie for them, Yes, Madam (also known as Police Assassins or In the Line of Duty Part 2) which also starred Michelle Yeoh. It proved to be a box office success. She ended up staying in Hong Kong until 1988 doing seven films there. Possibly her first US film was 24 Hours to Midnight, a Leo Fong directed film which also starred Stack Pierce, Juan Chapa and Bernie Pock.

Rothrock became one of the few western performers to achieve genuine stardom in the local Hong Kong film industry before achieving success in their own country. She was credited as 羅芙洛 ("Fu Lok Law" or "Foo Lok Law") in many Hong Kong movies. Producer Pierre David initiated Rothrock's move to the American turf. David offered her a co-starring role with Chad McQueen in Martial Law, Rothrock's first U.S. production. For the next ten years, she led a successful career in B-grade action movies. Her films include China O'Brien and China O'Brien 2, Guardian Angel, Honor & Glory, No Retreat, No Surrender 2 and Prince of the Sun amongst a roster of thirty films.

Rothrock appeared as Bertha Jo in the 1997 television film The Dukes of Hazzard: Reunion!. She was an inspiration for the video game character Sonya Blade from the Mortal Kombat fighting game franchise and lent her voice on the animated series Eek the Cat.

She made an appearance in the television series Hercules: The Legendary Journeys, playing Hera's second Enforcer in the 1996 episode "Not Fade Away".

After starring in the 2004 film Xtreme Fighter (a.k.a. Sci-Fighter), where she played Sally Kirk / The White Dragon, before she retired from acting to teach private martial arts lessons at her martial arts studio in Studio City, California.

She returned to acting for the role as Nanna in the 2012 Christmas family film Santa's Summer House, alongside British martial artist and actor Gary Daniels.

In 2014, she starred in the action movie Mercenaries, alongside Kristanna Loken, Brigitte Nielsen, Vivica A. Fox and Zoë Bell.

Radio and podcast appearances
Rothrock appeared on Ken Reid's TV Guidance Counselor podcast on March 16, 2016. Rothrock also appeared on Scott Adkins's The Art of Action - Episode 12 podcast on September 1, 2020.

Personal life
At the age of 19, Cynthia married her kung fu instructor Ernest Rothrock on September 25, 1976, at St. Mary's Church in the Greenwood Section of Moosic, Pennsylvania. They have since divorced. She has one daughter, Skyler Sophia Rothrock, who was born in 1999. She works as a martial arts teacher, and formerly co-owned a martial arts studio in Studio City, California as part of the Z Ultimate Self Defense Studios chain of martial arts studios.

She was romantically involved with Hong Kong film actor Mang Hoi in the '80s.

Filmography

(1996) Hercules: The Legendary Journeys (TV Series) as Enforcer II (Episode "Not Fade Away")
(1996) Sworn to Justice (a.k.a. Blond Justice) as Janna
(1996) Checkmate
(1996) The Encyclopedia of Martial Arts-Martial Combat
(1996) American Tigers as Herself
(1997) The Dukes of Hazzard: Reunion! (TV Movie) as Bertha Jo
(1997) Deep Cover as FBI Special Agent Kate Mason
(1998) The Hostage
(1999) Tiger Claws 3 as Linda Masterson
(2000) Manhattan Chase as Nancy
(2001) Ren she tou du
(2001) Redemption as Erin Murphy
(2002) Outside the Law as Julie Cosgrove
(2004) Xtreme Fighter (a.k.a. Sci-Fighter) as Sally 'The White Dragon' Kirk
(2007) Bala Perdida (a.k.a. Lost Bullet) as Cynthia
(2012) Santa's Summer House as Nanna
(2013) Badass Showdown as Ivy
(2014) Mercenaries as CIA Agent Mona Kendall
(2014) Rogue Space: The Adventures of Saber Raine
(2015) The Martial Arts Kid as Cindy
(2016) Showdown in Manila as Haines
(2016) Beyond the Game
(2016) Asian Ghost Story as The Narrator (voice)
(2016) Fists of Fury as Herself - Host
(2017) Star Raiders: The Adventures of Saber Raine as Kandra Syn
(2017) A Doggone Hollywood as Mom In Car
(2017) Death Fighter as Valerie
(2018) Fury of the Fist and the Golden Fleece as Counter Attendant
(2018) Cool Cat Kids Superhero as Momma Cat (voice)
(2018) B-Team as General Rothrock (voice)
(2018) Paying Mr. McGetty as Herself
(2021) Vendetta Vette as LaRue
(2021) Cool Cat Saves The Kids (Director's Cut) - Momma Cat (voice, archive footage from Cool Cat Kids Superhero)
(2022) Prey of Wrath as Brenda Sands
No Way Back as Angela O'Leary
Diary of A Lunatic as Mrs. Cloudover
Anadellia Rises as Priscilla Kasper

Bibliography

References

External links

1957 births
20th-century American actresses
20th-century Hong Kong actresses
21st-century American actresses
21st-century Hong Kong actresses
Actors from Scranton, Pennsylvania
Actresses from Pennsylvania
Actresses from Wilmington, Delaware
American expatriate actresses in Hong Kong
American female karateka
American female taekwondo practitioners
American film actresses
American people of Polish descent
American tang soo do practitioners
American wushu practitioners
Living people
Sportspeople from Scranton, Pennsylvania